Goon of Fortune is an Australian and New Zealand drinking game involving cheap cask wine (colloquially known as "goon"), played between any number of people. The name is a spoof on the TV show Wheel of Fortune.

A number of goonsacks are pegged around the outside of a rotary washing line. Players sit underneath it at the edges and agree how much wine each "win" involves. One player spins the hoist, and when the spin stops the winner(s) nearest a bag or the bags must drink that amount. Players may not touch the clothesline, and penalties for breaking the rules vary.

See also

 List of drinking games
 Hills Hoist – an eponym for rotary washing (also known as clothes) lines in Australia and sometimes New Zealand.

References

Drinking games
Australian inventions
Australian games